The following are the national records in athletics in Norway maintained by its national athletics federation: Norges Fri-Idrettsforbund (NFI).

Outdoor

Key to tables:

+ = en route to a longer distance

h = hand timing

OT = oversized track

A = affected by altitude

Mx = mixed competition

Men

Women

Indoor

Men

Women

Notes

References
General
Norwegian Men Outdoor Records 1 January 2023 updated
Norwegian Women Outdoor Records 1 January 2022 updated
Norwegian Men Indoor Records 1 January 2023 updated
Norwegian Women Indoor Records 1 January 2022 updated
Specific

External links
 NFI web site

Norway
Records
Athletics
Athletics